Adoration is a 2019 Belgian-French thriller film directed by Fabrice Du Welz and starring Thomas Gioria, Benoît Poelvoorde, and Fantine Harduin. It was written by Du Welz with Vincent Tavier and Romain Protat. The film premiered at the 2019 Locarno Film Festival.

It received the André Cavens Award for Best Film given by the Belgian Film Critics Association (UCC). At the 11th Magritte Awards, Adoration received six nominations, including Best Film and Best Screenplay for Du Welz.

Cast
 Thomas Gioria as Paul
 Benoît Poelvoorde as Hinkel
 Fantine Harduin as Gloria
 Anaël Snoek as Simone
 Gwendolyn Gourvenec as Doctor Loisel
 Peter Van Den Begin as Oscar Batts
 Laurent Lucas as Gloria's uncle
 Martha Canga Antonio as Jeanne
 Sandor Funtek as Lucien

Response

Critical reception

Accolades

References

External links
 

2019 films
2010s French-language films
2019 multilingual films
2019 thriller drama films
Belgian thriller drama films
2010s Dutch-language films
Films directed by Fabrice Du Welz
French thriller drama films
Belgian multilingual films
French multilingual films
2010s French films